Ajri may refer to:
 Ajri, India, a village in India
 Ajri (Gujjar), a term used for some nomadic Gujjars of South Asia
 Ajri Demirovski, Yugoslavian Turkish singer